
Year 495 BC was a year of the pre-Julian Roman calendar. At the time, it was known as the Year of the Consulship of Sabinus and Priscus (or, less frequently, year 259 Ab urbe condita). The denomination 495 BC for this year has been used since the early medieval period, when the Anno Domini calendar era became the prevalent method in Europe for naming years.

Events 
 Roman Republic 
 A temple is built on the Circus Maximus, between the Aventine and Palatine hills, in Rome, in honour of the god Mercury and was dedicated on 15 May. 
 The number of Roman tribes is increased to 21.
 Additional colonists were sent to the colony at Signia.
 The Volsci launch an invasion against Rome, but are defeated, and in retaliation Rome plunders Suessa Pometia.
 Roman troops defeat an invading force of Sabines.
 Roman troops defeat an army of the Aurunci near the town of Aricia.
 The beginning of discord between the plebs and patricians leading to the first secession of the plebs.

 China 
 King Fuchai of Wu ascends to the throne after his father, King Helü of Wu, reigning as the last king of Wu until 473 BC.

Births 
 Pericles, Athenian politician (d. 429 BC)

Deaths 
 Pythagoras of Samos
 Tarquinius Superbus, former king of Rome died in exile in Cumae

References